Us Girls was a weekly lifestyle magazine show in the Philippines hosted by Iya Villania, Cheska Garcia, and Angel Aquino, which airs every Thursday night on Studio 23. Garcia was later on replaced by Megan Young as a temporary host due to her pregnancy. It aired from March 5, 2006 to May 26, 2012, replacing F!.

After 6 years on air, ABS-CBN decided to cancel it for unknown reason.

Hosts
Iya Villania-Arellano (2006–2012)
Cheska Garcia-Kramer  (2006–2009, 2009–2012)
Angel Aquino  (2006–2012)
Megan Young  (2009–2010, 2012)

See also
List of programs aired by Studio 23

References

External links
 

Studio 23 original programming
Philippine television shows
2000s Philippine television series
2010s Philippine television series
2006 Philippine television series debuts
2012 Philippine television series endings
English-language television shows